The Royal Turks and Caicos Islands Police Force is the national police force of the Turks and Caicos Islands, a British Overseas Territory in the Lucayan Archipelago of the Atlantic Ocean and northern West Indies. It is one of the oldest police forces in the world.

History
The RTCIPF was formed in 1799, when John Dunmore was appointed 'High Constable', with three 'Special Constables' appointed to assist him in maintaining law and order throughout the island group. They were named the Royal Turks and Caicos Islands Police Force, and have operated ever since.

As the RTCIPF polices a British territory, but is also geographically closer to the United States (US), it is influenced by both in style and practice. Examples include traditional United Kingdom (UK) type uniforms and rank designations (from Constable to Commissioner), and the use of US type police vehicles, such as the Ford Police Interceptor Utility.

Structure
The force is headed by a Commissioner of Police, and is divided into two operational divisions:

A Division – the islands of Grand Turk, South Caicos, and Salt Cay (3 police stations, plus the airport police post)
B Division – the islands of Providenciales and North Caicos (6 police stations)

Leadership
The force is headed by a Commissioner, supported by a Deputy Commissioner. 
Each Division is headed by an Assistant Commissioner.
A  Superintendent is in command of each individual police station. 
There is also a small Tourist Police Unit reporting directly to the Deputy Commissioner. 
The head of criminal investigation holds the rank of Detective Superintendent.

Specialist Units
There are several specialist operational units, including a financial crime unit. There is a marine unit, equipped with inshore and ocean-going patrol vessels.

There is also a tactical unit equipped with former PSNI armoured Land Rover Tangis. The tactical unit is commanded by a Chief Superintendent.

Support
As a British Overseas Territory, at times of crisis the RTCIPF receives assistance from other agencies, such as the British Armed Forces. This happened in the 2020 coronavirus pandemic, when the Standing Joint Force Headquarters Group (a tri-service support group of sailors, marines, soldiers, and airmen who support governments during crises) deployed to assist the police and TCI government.

Staffing
The Royal Turks and Caicos Islands Police Force has 225 full-time sworn police officers. In addition to this number, there are volunteer special constables, and also civilian (non-sworn) police support staff.

Rank Structure
The RTCIPF has a rank structure, that is similar to other British police forces.

Uniform

The RTCIPF is a uniformed police force, with several orders of dress for different duties. The uniform and rank structure mirrors other British territories and United Kingdom forces in its look and approach. All officers, below the rank of Inspector, wear a unique identification number (known as a "Collar Number" after British early policeman wearing them on collars of uniforms) on all of their uniforms.

Formal dress
The RTCIPF have many uniforms for different duties. As one of the world's oldest police forces, with strong historical links to  British military and police forces, their uniform traditions are thus heavily influenced by British uniforms. Comparisons are made below.

'Whites'

The most formal order of dress for police officers is (in British Army use - No. 3 dress) the warm weather ceremonial uniform ('whites'), which consists of:

Males
 White bush jacket or tunic with high collar and silver buttons and whistle on a chain
 Black trousers with double red stripe
 Black peaked cap with red cap-band and police capbadge
 White gloves (senior officers)
 Blue waist sash (senior officers)
 Black polished belt with metal clasp
 Polished black shoes or boots

Females
 White bush jacket/tunic worn open at collar with tie and white shirt worn underneath, silver buttons and whistle on chain
 Black trousers with double red stripe or black skirt with double red stripe and stockings
 Black tall female cap with red cap-band and police capbadge
 White gloves (senior officers)
 Blue waist sash (senior officers)
 Black polished belt with metal clasp
 Polished black shoes or boots

On the epaulette of the tunic, "RTCIPF" letters are worn to denote police. 
Rank for Sergeants is worn on the upper sleeve area and on the epaulettes for senior officers (inspectors and above).

The staple item of a British police officer; the whistle on a chain, is worn and held between buttons and top pocket. Medals (if any) are worn on the left breast.

On parade with weapons (most formal occasions), junior ranks carry rifles and more senior officers may carry swords or swagger sticks.

'Blues'

The alternate (and one level down) formal uniform is the dark blue service dress (in British Army use - No. 2 dress) which is similar to 'whites', except:
 the white tunic is replaced by a dark blue tunic, worn open at the collar for males and females of all ranks, with a collar and tie underneath
 Sam Browne belts are worn over the top (for all ranks)
 whistles on chains are not worn however, but black lanyards are worn on the left shoulder
 white gloves for junior ranks and black leather gloves for officers
 black swagger sticks for senior officers are carried underneath the left arm
 Same headdress as for "whites" dress.

Day dress (undress) 

For everyday policing, the undress variants of the above are worn. This is the police version of the Army's No. 6 (warm weather bush jacket) uniform consisting of:
 Stone coloured bush jacket
 Stone coloured trousers
 Black shoes or boots
 Same headdress as above uniforms
 Black lanyard worn on the left
 Rank worn as above
 Medal ribbons to be worn on the left breast.

This is generally worn for non-physical work (such as meetings, indoor work), but not for more practical work nor more formal parades.

Everyday dress
This uniform is for everyday police work, such as patrolling and investigating. It consists of:
 White, grey or light blue short-sleeve shirt with insignia
 Black trousers with red piping
 Same headdress as above uniforms
 Black shoes/boots

Equipment is worn on waist belts and rank is worn in the same way as above. High visibility vests are worn for traffic-related work.

Operational dress/Fatigues
This uniform is for police work that is physically demanding and needs a less smart, simpler approach, such as firearms work. It consists of:
 Black polo shirt or t-shirt
 Black trousers
 Boots
 Baseball cap

Insignia is minimal, but "POLICE" in large letters is worn on the back of the shirt. Equipment is carried on the waist.

Equipment and Vehicles
The RTCIPF uses typical police equipment, such as motor vehicles, radios and arrest equipment.

Firearms
Some, RTCIPF officers carry firearms. This is less usual in most UK and British Overseas Territories police services/forces, but in some territories it is more common practice.

Vehicles
Because of its proximity to the US, the RTCIPF uses more US-style police vehicles, such as the Ford Police Interceptor Utility, these vehicles are marked, have red & blue flashing lights, the 911 emergency number and the police motto. The tactical and marine units (see above) use armoured vehicles and boats respectively.

See Also
Turks and Caicos Islands Regiment

References

External links
 Official force website
 Force social media page

Turks and Caicos Islands
Police
1799 establishments in the British Empire
1790s establishments in the Caribbean
Government agencies established in 1790